Venera 10 ( meaning Venus 10), or 4V-1 No. 661, was a Soviet uncrewed space mission to Venus. It consisted of an orbiter and a lander. It was launched on June 14, 1975, 03:00:31 UTC and had a mass of 5033 kg (11096 lb).

Orbiter
When the mission launched, the Soviet Union only disclosed that the mission's objective was to explore Venus and the surrounding space. Western sources speculated that the spacecraft contained a lander.

The orbiter entered Venus orbit on October 23, 1975. Its mission was to serve as a communications relay for the lander and to explore cloud layers and atmospheric parameters with several instruments and experiments:

 1.6–2.8 μm IR Spectrometer
 8–28 μm IR Radiometer
 352 nm UV Photometer
 2 Photopolarimeters (335–800 nm)
 300–800 nm Spectrometer
 Lyman-α H/D Spectrometer
 Bistatic radar mapping
 CM, DM radio occultations
 Triaxial Magnetometer
 345–380 nm UV Camera
 355–445 nm Camera
 6 Electrostatic analyzers
 2 Modulation Ion Traps
 Low-Energy Proton / Alpha detector
 Low-Energy Electron detector
 3 Semiconductor counters
 2 Gas-Discharge counters
 Cherenkov detector

The orbiter consisted of a cylinder with two solar panel wings and a high gain parabolic antenna attached to the curved surface. A bell-shaped unit holding propulsion systems was attached to the bottom of the cylinder, and mounted on top was a  sphere which held the landers. To reach Venus, the spacecraft traveled in a heliocentric orbit from Earth to the planet with perihelion of 0.72 AU, apohelion of 1.02 AU, eccentricity of 0.17, inclination of 2.3 degrees and orbital period of 294 days.

Lander

On October 23, 1975, the lander separated from the orbiter, and touched down with the sun near zenith, at 05:17 UT, on October 25.
A system of circulating fluid was used to distribute the heat load. This system, plus precooling prior to entry, permitted operation of the spacecraft for 65 minutes after landing. During descent, heat dissipation and deceleration were accomplished sequentially by protective hemispheric shells, three parachutes, a disk-shaped drag brake, and a compressible, metal, doughnut-shaped, landing cushion.

It landed near the border area between Beta Regio and Hyndla Regio (within a 150 km radius of ), three days after the touchdown of, and 2200 km from Venera 9. Venera 10 measured a surface windspeed of 3.5 m/s. Other measurements included atmospheric pressure at various heights, and temperature, and surface light levels. Venera 10 was the second probe to send back black and white television pictures from the Venusian surface (after Venera 9). Venera 10 photographs showed lava rocks of pancake shape with lava or other weathered rocks in between. Planned 360 degree panoramic pictures could not be taken because, as with Venera 9, one of two camera lens covers failed to come off, limiting pictures to 180 degrees.

The lander communicated with Earth using the Venera 10 orbiter as a communication relay.

Lander Payload:

 Temperature and pressure sensors
 Accelerometer
 Visible / IR photometer – IOV-75
 Backscatter and multi-angle nephelometers – MNV-75
 P-11 Mass spectrometer – MAV-75
 Panoramic telephotometers (2, with lamps)
 Anemometer – ISV-75
 Gamma-ray spectrometer – GS-12V
 Gamma ray densitometer – RP-75
 Radio Doppler experiment

See also

 List of missions to Venus
 Timeline of artificial satellites and space probes

References

Venera program
1975 in spaceflight
1975 in the Soviet Union
Derelict landers (spacecraft)
Spacecraft launched in 1975
Non Earth orbiting satellites of the Soviet Union
4MV